Wesley Joseph Fang (born December 1977) is an Australian politician. He has been a NSW Nationals member of the New South Wales Legislative Council since 9 August 2017, when he filled a casual vacancy caused by the resignation of Duncan Gay. 

Fang is the first person of Chinese heritage to represent the Nationals in the New South Wales Parliament. Fang holds a degree in aviation from the University of New South Wales and was formerly a pilot with the Australian Army and Telstra Child Flight. He was a director of the Wagga Wagga Business Chamber and founded the Wagga Ratepayers' Community. Fang ran as a National Party  candidate on the Coalition New South Wales Senate ticket at the 2016 federal election.

Fang was elected as the Deputy President and Chair of Committees of the Legislative Council in March 2022 following a vote of the House.

References

Living people
Members of the New South Wales Legislative Council
National Party of Australia members of the Parliament of New South Wales
University of New South Wales alumni
Australian Army officers
Australian people of Singaporean descent
Australian aviators
1977 births
21st-century Australian politicians